This is a simplified family tree of the House of Bourbon (in Spanish, Borbón; in Italian, Borbone; in English, Borbon. The House of Bourbon is a cadet branch of the Capetian dynasty that descended from a younger son of King Louis IX of France. Louis IX's grandson was the first duke of Bourbon, whose descendants would later become Kings of France in accordance to the Salic law. In the present day, family representatives are the King of Spain and the Grand Duke of Luxembourg. Several others are pretenders to the thrones of France, Two Sicilies, and Brazil.

From Louis IX to Henry IV

 Descent from Henry IV

See also
House of Bourbon
List of Spanish monarchs - List of French monarchs
Duke of Bourbon - Duke of Parma - Prince of Condé - Prince of Conti - Duke of Anjou
Henry IV of France's succession
:File:Habsburg-bourbon-parma-2siciliesX.png: A chart of the dynastic links among the royal houses of Habsburg, Bourbon, Bourbon-Parma and Bourbon-Two Sicilies

References

External links
Family tree of the House of Bourbon

Family Tree, Bourbon
Family trees